John Wesley Snyder (June 21, 1895October 8, 1985) was an American businessman and senior federal government official. Thanks to a close personal friendship with President Harry S Truman, Snyder became Secretary of the Treasury in the Truman administration. He is the first native-born Arkansan to hold a US Cabinet post. Historian Alonzo Hamby emphasizes Snyder's conservatism, stating that he was openly skeptical of New Dealism, broad-gauged social programs, and intellectuals who believed the economy could be run from Washington.

Early life
Snyder was born in Jonesboro, Arkansas, on June 21, 1895, to Jeremiah "Jerre" Hartwell Snyder and his wife Ellen (Hatcher),the third of six children. His father owned a small patent medicine manufacturing and distribution business in Jonesboro, Arkansas. Snyder obtained his early education through high school in Jonesboro, Arkansas and later attended Vanderbilt University’s School of Engineering from 1914 to 1915. Because of finances, he quit and returned to Arkansas, moving to Forrest City, Arkansas   where he boarded with his sister, Sula Snyder Warren, and taught at a small country school.

Snyder volunteered for the army in 1915 and trained at Fort Logan H. Roots in North Little Rock, Arkansas, in the artillery.  He served with distinction as an officer in the Thirty-second Artillery.  He saw action during World War I in five different sectors of the Western Front and was decorated for his service by both the United States and France. During his service in the artillery, he became friends with other noted Americans such as boxer Gene Tunney, America’s “ace of aces” fighter pilot Eddie Rickenbacker, and future presidents Dwight Eisenhower and Harry S. Truman (also in the artillery). Snyder was mustered out of the army in 1919 and returned to Arkansas after the war. He retained his commission as a captain and ultimately achieved the rank of colonel in the Army Reserve.

On January 5, 1920, he married Carrie Evlyn Cook (1895-1956). They had one daughter, Edith Cook "Drucie" Snyder Horton (1925-1999) born in Forrest City, Arkansas. Although he planned to return to school to become an electrical engineer, at the urging of his uncle, Snyder took his first job in the banking industry as a bookkeeper in a bank in Forrest City, Arkansas. During the next ten years, he advanced rapidly in his chosen profession, working as an officer of numerous banks in Arkansas and Missouri.

Washington
Snyder moved to Washington in the early 1930s with a broad background in banking and business. He held several public and private offices including National Bank Receiver in the Office of the Comptroller of the Currency, Federal Loan Administrator, and Director of War Mobilization and Reconversion. In the last office he played a leading part in the transition of the American economy from a wartime to a peacetime basis. Liberals complained that he removed federal controls on the economy too quickly after the war, hurting consumers, delaying the housing program and bankrupting small businesses. His biographer says, "His handling of the steel crisis in 1946 was an even greater fiasco."

Treasury Secretary
Snyder was appointed Secretary of the Treasury in 1946 by his close personal friend President Harry S. Truman, with whom he had served in the Army Reserves. Editorials criticized the cronyism and said his narrow range of experience made him unfit for the job.  His task as Secretary was to establish a stable postwar economy.  The main points of his program were maintaining confidence in the credit of the government, reducing the federal debt, keeping the interest rate low, and encouraging public thrift through investment in U.S. Savings Bonds.  A deeply conservative businessman, he had faith that the  free economy would work itself out. He reduced the national debt while balancing the budget.  He was reluctant to spend large sums on the Marshall Plan of aid to Europe.  Snyder had little diplomatic experience, and in his negotiations with British leadership regarding Britain's need for dollars, he angered his counterparts. Paul Nitze, an American negotiator, recalled a meeting in Washington in September 1949:
at one point Secretary Snyder made some very --  well, remarks which I thought were wholly undiplomatic and rude and showed his lack of concern for the UK problem (the general sense of them was why didn't the UK get a hold of itself, and why didn't its people do some work for change and why don't you cure those productivity problems in the United Kingdom, and why don't you get off your butt).

At another meeting his British counterpart, Chancellor of the Exchequer Hugh Gaitskell, concluded that Snyder was, "a pretty small minded, small town semi-isolationist." Luckily for the British, Snyder was outmaneuvered by Secretary of State Dean Acheson, who was much more sympathetic.

Snyder funded the Korean War by increasing taxes.  He feuded constantly with the Federal Reserve system, until it became more independent in 1951. He retired from government in 1953 at the end of Truman's second term.

Snyder died in Seabrook Island, South Carolina, on October 8, 1985, at the age of 90, and was buried in Washington National Cathedral.

Notes

Further reading
 Fielding, Jeremy. "The primacy of national security? American responses to the British financial crisis of 1949." Diplomacy and Statecraft 11#1 (2000): 163-188.
 Heidenheimer, A. J. "John Snyder's Hope Chest," The New Republic, 15 October 1951 pp 12–13
 Kapuria-Foreman, Vibha.

Primary sources
 Oral History Interview with John W. Snyder, at the Truman Library
 Snyder, John F. "The Treasury and Economic Policy" in  Francis Howard Heller, ed. Economics and the Truman administration (Univ Press of Kansas, 1981). pp 24–27

External links
A selection of Snyder's papers related to the 1951 Accord, are available on the FRASER
Finding aid for Snyder's papers held at the Truman Presidential Library
 

1895 births
1985 deaths
20th-century American politicians
American Episcopalians
United States Army personnel of World War I
United States Secretaries of the Treasury
People from Jonesboro, Arkansas
Arkansas Democrats
Truman administration cabinet members
Burials at Washington National Cathedral